Marek Rosa is a Slovak entrepreneur, programmer, and computer game developer. He is known as the CEO and founder of Keen Software House, an independent video game design studio, and CEO, Founder, and CTO of GoodAI, a company dedicated to the research and development of general artificial intelligence. Both companies are based in Prague, the Czech Republic, and have their headquarters in the historical Oranžérie.

Keen Software House 

Marek started as a programmer working independently on the Miner Wars games and the VRAGE engine. In 2010 he founded Keen Software House.

Miner Wars 
In 2012, Keen Software House release their first video game, Miner Wars Arena. Later that year they released their second game, Miner Wars 2081.

Space Engineers 

Keen Software House and Marek gained notoriety for their third game Space Engineers, which has sold over 4 million copies. Space Engineers is a voxel-based sandbox game that launched on Steam Early Access on October 23, 2013, and fully released on February 28, 2019.

Space Engineers presents the player with an open world sandbox that is defined by the players own creativity. Based on real science, Space Engineers features a realistic, volumetric-based physics engine: everything in the game can be assembled, disassembled, damaged and destroyed.

During the majority of its developmental life, Space Engineers was updated on a weekly basis based on stated development goals and community feedback. Since initial launch it experienced major updates adding survival mode, multiplayer, dedicated server support, planets, and more. Space Engineers is open to community creation and modding.

On October 20, 2014, Keen Software House announced that Space Engineers had sold over 1,000,000 copies.

On May 14, 2015, the development firm provided open access (but not making the game free) to the source code to accelerate mod development.

The Space Engineers population & player count has continued to grow over the years with its largest increases in concurrent players occurring over the last two years (2019/2020).

Space Engineers was well received by both critics and the gaming community. According to steam as of 22 February 2021 89% of the 74,301 reviews have been positive.

Medieval Engineers 

On January 13, 2015, Keen Software House announced their third title and second engineering game named Medieval Engineers. It was also announced that the game will be available on Steam Early Access.

Medieval Engineers is a sandbox game about engineering, construction and the maintenance of architectural works and mechanical equipment using medieval technology. Players build cities, castles and fortifications; construct mechanical devices and engines; perform landscaping and underground mining.

Medieval Engineers is inspired by real medieval technology and the way people survived and built architectural and mechanical works in medieval times. Medieval Engineers strives to follow the laws of physics and real history and does not use technologies that were not available from the 5th to the 15th century.

GoodAI 
In 2014 Marek founded GoodAI with a $10 million personal investment and in 2015 the company was announced publicly. Marek is the CEO and CTO of GoodAI and set the mission which is to “develop safe general artificial intelligence - as fast as possible - to help humanity and understand the universe.”

In November 2016 Marek published the first research roadmap, outlining the direction of GoodAI focusing on developing topology architectures that support the gradual accumulation of skills.

In January 2017 Marek announced the creation of the AI Roadmap Institute, which aims to accelerate the creation of safe human-level artificial intelligence by encouraging, studying, mapping and comparing roadmaps towards this goal.

In February 2017 Marek founded the General AI Challenge, pledging  $5 million in prize money to tackle crucial research problems in human-level AI development. The first round of the General AI Challenge was based around Gradual Learning and concluded in September 2017, and the second round was based on Solving the AI Race and concluded in July 2018.

In August 2018 Marek and GoodAI hosted the Human-Level AI Conference in Prague. For his work with GoodAI and involvement with the Human-Level AI Conference, Marek was awarded the Person of the Year Award at the AI Awards in Prague.

In December 2019 Marek and the GoodAI team published the Badger architecture paper, a unifying AI architecture defined by its key principle of modular life-long learning. The Badger architecture defines the direction of GoodAI's research.

In August 2020 at the Meta-Learning and Multi-Agent Learning Workshop, which was organized by GoodAI, Marek announced the GoodAI Grants initiative. A $300,000 grant fund for artificial intelligence research.

Oranžérie reconstruction 
Marek purchased the historical baroque chateau, the Oranžérie in 2018. He has reconstructed the building and it is now the headquarters of both GoodAI and Keen Software House.

References

External links 

 Marek Rosa's blog

1979 births
Living people
Video game producers
Slovak video game designers